Ericson 23 may refer to:

Ericson 23-1 a 1969 American sailboat design
Ericson 23-2 a 1975 American sailboat design